Jose Yu Sunsay, GBM, GBS, SBS, JP
(born November 1938 in Shishi, Fujian) is a Hong Kong pro-Beijing businessman who is the Chairman of the HKI Group. As a member of the pro-Beijing camp, Yu maintained good relations with the Chinese government, and was appointed as a Hong Kong affair advisor in 1993, and a National committee member of the Chinese People's Political Consultative Conference representing Hong Kong, serving in that post from 2003 to 2013. Ho was awarded the Grand Bauhinia Medal, the highest award under the Hong Kong honours and awards system by Chief Executive CY Leung on 1 July 2014.

Awards
1998: Justice of the Peace
1999: Silver Bauhinia Star
2007: Gold Bauhinia Star
2014: Grand Bauhinia Medal

References

1938 births
Living people
Hong Kong businesspeople
Recipients of the Gold Bauhinia Star
Recipients of the Grand Bauhinia Medal
Hong Kong Affairs Advisors
Democratic Alliance for the Betterment and Progress of Hong Kong politicians
Members of the Election Committee of Hong Kong, 2017–2021